Phil Baker (born 22 March 1952) is a former Australian rules footballer who played for North Melbourne and Geelong in the Victorian Football League (VFL) during the 1970s.

Baker was a high marking forward and started his career at North Melbourne in 1971. Five games into the 1975 season he was transferred to Geelong by Allen Aylett due to financial reasons. His loyalty to North was never questioned after his time away and in 1977 he proved to be an integral part of the North Melbourne forward line. This was evident as he played a major role in a premiership year with 35 goals. He kicked six of the club's nine goals in the 1977 Grand Final against Collingwood and three in the following weekend's Grand Final Replay. His accuracy at goal as opposed to Arnold Briedis's inaccuracy, kept North Melbourne in the game against Collingwood. In 1978 he played in North Melbourne's losing grand final against Hawthorn and kicked another bag of six goals. The highlight of the 1978 grand final was his high leaping marks and desperate efforts to get North Melbourne back in the game. However, his efforts alone were not enough to win the grand final for North Melbourne. In these three grand finals he kicked a total of 15 goals. Phil Baker's nickname was "Snake" and wore jumper number 29. His teammates usually entered the field with the immortal words ringing in their ears, "No messing around, it's long bombs to Snake, fellas."<ref>https://www.nmfc.com.au/news/314172/long-bombs-to-snake<ref>

References

External links
 
 

1952 births
Living people
Australian rules footballers from New South Wales
North Melbourne Football Club players
North Melbourne Football Club Premiership players
Geelong Football Club players
Albury Football Club players
One-time VFL/AFL Premiership players